Samantha Everton is an Australian photographic artist who creates images with dreamlike and theatrical qualities, living in Melbourne.

Early life
Everton was raised in Emerald, a small town in central Queensland. She grew up with one biological brother and three adopted siblings from South East Asia. Everton's multicultural family gave her an awareness of issues pertaining to race and culture and how people react to difference and departure from normativity. 
Her works often include motifs of innocence and thematic references to childhood.

Everton studied photography at the Royal Melbourne Institute of Technology.

Career
At the start of her photographic career, she worked as a cadet photographer for the Melbourne Times, and volunteered in Photographic studios. 
She has had her images published in several magazines, including Vogue and the New Yorker Magazine.
She has also won multiple awards, including First and third prize at the 2010 Paris International Photography Awards, the 2005 Australian Leica Documentary Photographer of the year award, and the 2003 AIPP Australian Professional Photography awards.

References

General references
 

Australian photographers
Living people
Year of birth missing (living people)
Australian women photographers
21st-century Australian women artists
21st-century Australian photographers
21st-century women photographers
Photographers from Melbourne
Photographers from Queensland